Konya Ethnography Museum is an ethnographic museum devoted to the people, cultures and lifestyle in and around Konya, Turkey.

The museum is on Sahip Ata Street. It is a two-story building with a basement. The basement is reserved for the offices and the photoshop. The conference room is in the ground floor. The museum was established on 6 December 1975.

Exhibited items
The exhibited items are:
 Historical carpets: Some of more notable carpets are those from Eşrefoğlu Mosque dated to 13th and 15th centuries.
 Women’s traditional wear such as bindallı, salta, cepken and kaftan etc.
 Ornaments such as embroidery, bracelet and neckband etc.
 Ottoman writing tools
 Examples of early Konya newspapers,
 Metallic keys and locks,
 Copper, bronze, glass and porcelain kitchen tools,
 Silver and bronze candelabras,
 Coffee tools,
 Beads,
 Weapons,
 Hand written books.
The personal ethnographic collections of Refet Yardımcı and Kenan Özbel are also  on display in the museum.

References

Ethnographic museums in Turkey
1975 establishments in Turkey
Museums established in 1975
Meram District
Ethnography